The A35 is a major road in southern England, connecting Honiton in Devon and Southampton in Hampshire. It is a trunk road for some of its length. Most of its route passes through Dorset and the New Forest. It originally connected Exeter and Southampton, the original A35 ran along what is now the A3052 joining the present road at Charmouth.

Route

Beginning in Honiton at the eastern junction with the A30 road, the A35 travels in a roughly south-easterly direction past Axminster, Charmouth and Bridport. After Bridport, there is a  section of dual carriageway, before it reaches its bypass around Dorchester. Continuing roughly south-easterly still, it becomes dual carriageway again near Upton, before returning to a single carriageway through Poole and Bournemouth, apart from a small section of dual carriageway on Wessex Way. On reaching Christchurch, there is a dual-carriageway bypass. It then heads in a north-easterly direction through the New Forest, passing through Lyndhurst where it meets the A337 road (to Lymington). It continues through Ashurst and Totton, meeting the A36 road and M271 motorway at grade separated junctions. It then turns north-east, acting as the western part of Southampton's ring road, with the A27 road making up the eastern part. It terminates at Swaythling, on the northern outskirts of Southampton.

History

1922 - Road classification
The road number was created with the 1922 classification of roads in the United Kingdom. At that time its western terminus was on the then A30 in Heavitree, Exeter. In 1966 the section from Charmouth to Exeter was de-trunked and renumbered to A3052, with the A35 directed over the former A373 to Honiton, terminating at the then-new A30 Honiton Bypass.

1987/88 - Building of Dorchester and Bridport Bypasses
The A35bis a main route along England's south coast, and is congested. To help solve the congestion, sections of the A35 were upgraded between Honiton and Poole. In 1969 the Ministry of Transport recorded the case for bypasses around Bridport and Dorchester. The  bypass to the south of Bridport opened almost two decades later in 1987, followed by the  bypass to the south of Dorchester in 1988.

1990/91 - Building of Axminster and Charmouth Village Bypasses 
Following the re-routing onto the former A373 road, a major traffic bottleneck was the town of Axminster. A much-desired southern bypass for the town was indefinitely postponed in 1980 by the then Parliamentary Under-Secretary of State for Transport, Kenneth Clarke. The  project was eventually authorized by Act of Parliament in 1987, with construction beginning in 1990 approximately following the line of a Roman road. Charmouth village was bypassed in 1991, with the Charmouth Tunnel bypassed at the same time. The defunct tunnel was converted into a shooting range in 2010.

1999 - Puddletown Bypass 
The Puddletown dual carriageway bypass which opened in 1999 (together with the A30 Honiton-Exeter dualling) were financed under a Design, Build, Finance and Operate (DBFO) contract running from 1996 to 2026.

2004-2007 - Road straightening between Slepe and Upton

Bournemouth Centenary Way diversion
In Bournemouth, it has been diverted around the Sovereign Centre of Boscombe along Centenary Way resulting in a  concurrency with the A338; much of its former route is now pedestrianised.

Incidents
In May 2021, a sinkhole opened on the carriageway following emergency repairs to a pothole on the A35 Puddletown bypass near the junction for Troytown. The road was closed to allow remedial works to be carried out.

Due to the complex ground conditions repairs took 8 months to complete with temporary signals controlling single-file traffic for that time.

References

External links

SABRE page on the A35

Roads in England
Roads in Devon
Roads in Dorset
Roads in Hampshire